This is a chronological list of conflicts in which peasants played a significant role.

Background

The history of peasant wars spans over two thousand years.  A variety of factors fueled the emergence of the peasant revolt phenomenon, including:

 Tax resistance 
 Social inequality 
 Religious war 
 National liberation 
 Resistance against serfdom 
 Redistribution of land
 External factors such as plague and famine

Later peasant revolts such as the Telangana Rebellion were also influenced by agrarian socialist ideologies such as Maoism.

The majority of peasant rebellions ended prematurely and were unsuccessful. Peasants suffered from limited funding and lacked the training and organisational capabilities of professional armies.

Chronological list
The list gives the name, the date, the peasant allies and enemies, and the result of these conflicts following this legend:

See also
 Servile Wars
 Peasant movement
 Popular revolts in late-medieval Europe
 Maoism
 United Nations Declaration on the Rights of Peasants

References

Sources

 

 

 

 
 

Popular revolt in late-medieval Europe
Lists of events
Politics-related lists

sv:Bondeuppror